XHATF-FM is a radio station broadcasting on 95.7 FM from Atlacomulco, State of Mexico. XHATF is a social station owned by Fundación Educacional de Medios, A.C., and operated by Grupo Rotativo as "Cadena Azul Radio" with a Spanish oldies format. Programming originates from studios in the state capital of Toluca.

History
On April 11, 2018, the Federal Telecommunications Institute approved the award of a social radio station to Fundación Educacional de Medios, A.C., on an application the social group had made in 2016. The station began broadcasting July 1, 2020, under Rotativo operation, with Spanish-language oldies music and a morning news program known as Sin Filtro.

References

Radio stations established in 2020
Radio stations in the State of Mexico
2020 establishments in Mexico